Ding Haichun (born April 1954) is a vice admiral (zhong jiang) of China's People's Liberation Army Navy (PLAN). He has been a Deputy Political Commissar of the PLAN since December 2014.

Biography
Ding Haichun was born in Yiyang, in Central China's Hunan Province.

In late 2006, Ding became the director of the Political Department the PLA Naval Command Academy. In late 2007, he was appointed political commissar of the North Sea Fleet's Lushun Support Base. In late 2009, he became political commissar of the PLA Navy Logistics Department. After roughly two years in this position, Ding moved to the East Sea Fleet as its political commissar.

In 2007, Ding wrote an article in Political Work Study Journal about a navy conference focusing on cadre development, possibly indicating expertise in personnel management. In 2013, he was elected a member of the 12th National People's Congress.

In July 2013, Ding was appointed Director of the PLA Navy's Political Department, and promoted to the rank of vice admiral. He was replaced as East Sea Fleet political commissar by Rear Admiral Wang Huayong, who also served concurrently as Nanjing MR deputy political commissar.

In December 2014, Ding became a deputy political commissar of the PLA Navy, replacing Vice Admiral Ma Faxiang, who had committed suicide.

References

1954 births
Living people
People's Liberation Army generals from Hunan
People's Liberation Army Navy admirals
Delegates to the 12th National People's Congress
People from Yiyang